Francis Neil Hasell (15 September 1918 – 1 February 1998) was an Australian rules footballer who played with North Melbourne in the Victorian Football League (VFL).

Notes

External links 

1918 births
1998 deaths
Australian rules footballers from Victoria (Australia)
North Melbourne Football Club players